Don Munroe (born 1927 or 1928) was a Canadian ice hockey player with the Sudbury Wolves. He won a silver medal at the 1949 World Ice Hockey Championships in Stockholm, Sweden.

References

1920s births
Possibly living people
Canadian ice hockey left wingers
Sudbury Wolves players
Ice hockey people from Toronto